Raspail is a station of the Paris Métro, serving Line 4 and Line 6 in the 14th arrondissement. The station is now fitted with Platform screen doors, due to the Line 4 being fitted for automation.

Location
The station is located under Boulevard Raspail at the intersection with Boulevard Edgar-Quinet.

Name
The station is named after the Boulevard Raspail, named after 19th-century scientist and statesman François-Vincent Raspail.

History
The station opened on 24 April 1906  with the opening of the extension of line 2 Sud from Passy to Place d'Italie. On 14 October 1907, line 2 Sud became part of line 5. On 12 October 1942, the section of line 5 between Étoile and Place d'Italie, including Raspail was transferred from line 5 to line 6 in order to separate the underground and elevated sections of the metro (because the latter were more vulnerable to air attack during World War II). The line 4 platforms were opened on 30 October 1909 when the southern section of line 4 was opened between Raspail and Porte d'Orléans; this was temporarily separated from the section of line 4 opened on 21 April 1908 between Châtelet and Porte de Clignancourt.  On 9 January 1910, the connecting section opened under the Seine between Châtelet and Raspail, completing line 4.

The station was renovated a first time after 1969 by adopting the style Mouton-Duvernet two-tone orange, cutting radically with the dominant white of the original metro. The station was renovated a second time in 2008 as part of the Renouveau du métro program and loses its Mouton style decoration and its orange tiles. The new furniture was blue on Line 6 and water green on Line 4. In 2017, new modifications were applied to the platforms of Line 4, as part of the future automation of the line.

In 2018, 1,995,962 travelers entered this station (connecting passengers between the two metro lines were not taken into account) which places it at the 259th position of the metro stations for its attendance.

Passenger services

Access
The station has two entrances in front of nos. 234 and 241 of the Boulevard Raspail.

Station layout

Platforms
The platforms of the two lines are parallel and located at the same level. The platforms in the direction of Mairie de Montrouge and Charles de Gaulle-Étoile are connected to each other by two passages, offering a direct connection. The platforms of the two lines are of standard configuration. They are separated by the metro tracks located in the center and the roofs of each line are elliptical. They are decorated in the style used for the majority of the metro stations. White ceramic bevelled tiles cover the walls, the tympans and the outlets of the corridors. The roofs are coated and painted white and the name of the station is in the Parisine font on enamelled plates. On the platforms of line 6, the lighting strip is white and rounded in the Gaudin style of the metro revival of the 2000s, the advertising frames are a white ceramic and the seats are in Akiko blue style. On Line 4, the metro is automated, there are no more banners, advertising frames, advertising or seats. After the successful experiment of the Line 14, the RATP started to look forward to automate existing lines. After completely automating line 1, the RATP started focusing on the Line 4. Because of that, Raspail was fitted with Platform screen doors and were installed in September and October 2018.

Bus connections
The station is served by Line 68 of the RATP Bus Network.

Nearby
Nearby are the Fondation Cartier pour l'Art Contemporain (contemporary art museum), the École Spéciale d'Architecture (architecture school) and the Montparnasse Cemetery.

Gallery

References

Paris Métro stations in the 14th arrondissement of Paris
Railway stations in France opened in 1906